The Plaza Hotel (or Hotel Plaza) is a four-story historic hotel located in the Old Havana section of Havana.

The Plaza Hotel was founded by Captain Walter Fletcher Smith, and was built from an existing colonial building. It was designed by Ricardo Galbis Abella, and constructed by the New York firm of Purdy and Henderson, Engineers. The hotel opened in 1906 and was inaugurated in 1909. The hotel was renovated in 1919 with a roof garden that included a ballroom and restaurant. Guests at the hotel included Albert Einstein, Babe Ruth, Isadora Duncan, and Anna Pavlova.

A casino was opened in the hotel during the 1950s. It was owned by Philadelphia crime family member Angelo Bruno, along with Joseph "Hoboken Joe" Stassi and his son Joe Stassi Jr. Stassi was an associate of mobster Meyer Lansky. The casino was destroyed by mobs in early January 1959 as Fidel Castro's rebel army overtook Havana.

During the 1980s, the hotel was restored and it was reopened in 1991 and became part of the Gran Caribe hotel group.

References

Hotels in Havana
Hotels established in 1909
20th-century architecture in Cuba